Kristina Krstić (born 1 July 1989) is a Serbian football striker currently playing in the Kazakhstani Championship for BIIK Kazygurt. She previously played for Mašinac Niš in the Serbian First League. She has played the Champions League with both teams, and she is a member of the Serbian national team. She scored a winner over Croatia in the 2011 World Cup qualifying.

References

1989 births
Living people
Serbian women's footballers
Serbia women's international footballers
Expatriate women's footballers in Kazakhstan
Women's association football forwards
BIIK Kazygurt players
ŽFK Mašinac PZP Niš players